The Ganga Sagar Express is an Express train belonging to Eastern Railway zone that runs between Sealdah and Jaynagar in India. It is currently being operated with 13185/13186 train numbers on Daily basis.
It includes coaches of First AC, AC two tier, AC three tier, and sleeper class,& General Coaches but does not include a pantry car. The Tatkal scheme is available.

Time Table

Traction 

Since the route is now fully electrified, it is hauled by Sealdah-based WAP-7 or Howrah-based WAP-4 throughout the journey.

References

See also 

 Kolkata railway station
 Jaynagar railway station
 Kolkata - Jaynagar Weekly Express
 Howrah - Jaynagar Passenger

Transport in Kolkata
Transport in Jainagar
Rail transport in Bihar
Named passenger trains of India
Rail transport in West Bengal
Rail transport in Jharkhand
Express trains in India